Jary is a surname. Notable people with the surname include:

 Michael Jary (1906–1988), German composer, born Maximilian Michael Andress Jarczyk
 Norm Jary (1929–2021), Canadian mayor and broadcaster
 Sydney Jary (1924–2019), British army officer

See also
 Jary, a village in south-west Poland
 Wilcze Jary, another Polish village
 Milan Jarý (born 1952), Czech cross-country skier
 Vladimír Jarý (born 1947), Czech handball player